Amore is the Italian word for "love". It may come from Amare which is "to love" in Latin.

People
 Alexis Amore, pornographic actress
 Eugenio Amore, Italian beach volleyball player
 Gianna Amore, Playboy centerfold
 Gregg Amore, Secretary of State of Rhode Island

Film and TV
 Amore!, a 1993 American film
 L'Amore (film), 1948 Italian film directed by Roberto Rossellini
 Amore (1936 film), a 1936 Italian film Carlo Ludovico Bragaglia
 Amore (1974 film), a 1974 French film directed by Henry Chapier

Music

Albums
 Amore (Alessandra Mussolini album), a 1982 album by Alessandra Mussolini
 Amore (Andrea Bocelli album), a 2006 album by classical crossover singer Andrea Bocelli
 Amore (The Hooters album), a 1983 album by The Hooters
 Amore (Wanda album), 2014 debut album by Austrian band Wanda

Songs and compositions
"Amore", 1987 song by BZN
"Amore", 1976 song by Krisma
"Amore", 2016 song by Babymetal from the album Metal Resistance
"Amore", 2018 song by Pitbull featuring Leona Lewis from the film Gotti
"Amore", 2021 song by Bebe Rexha featuring Rick Ross from the album Better Mistakes
 "Amoré (Sexo)", a song by Santana featuring Macy Gray from the album Shaman
 "L'amore" (Sonohra song), 2008 song by Sonohra
"L'Amore", 1966 song by Don Backy
"L'Amore", 1973 song by Fred Bongusto
"L'Amore", 1958 song by Tonina Torrielli
Amore, a composition for piano by Ryuichi Sakamoto

Other
 Amore Pacific, cosmetics brand of Taepyeongyang Corporation
 Partito dell'Amore, Italian political party

See also
 De amore (disambiguation)
 D'Amore (disambiguation)
 Un amore (disambiguation)
 Amor (disambiguation)
 Amora (disambiguation)
 Amour (disambiguation)
 L'Amour (disambiguation)
 Mi amor (disambiguation)
 Mi amore (disambiguation)
 "That's Amore", a 1953 Dean Martin song
 Love (disambiguation), Italian translation of amore